Thalestridae is a family of copepods belonging to the order Harpacticoida.

Genera

Genera:
 Amenophia Boeck, 1865
 Eudactylopus Scott, 1909
 Marionobiotus Chappuis, 1940

References

Copepods